This article comprises three sortable tables of major mountain peaks of the nation of Greenland (Kalaallit Nunaat).  Kalaallit Nunaat includes the Island of Greenland and surrounding islands.

The summit of a mountain or hill may be measured in three principal ways:
The topographic elevation of a summit measures the height of the summit above a geodetic sea level.  The first table below ranks the 40 highest major summits of Greenland by elevation.
The topographic prominence of a summit is a measure of how high the summit rises above its surroundings.  The second table below ranks the 40 most prominent summits of Greenland.
The topographic isolation (or radius of dominance) of a summit measures how far the summit lies from its nearest point of equal elevation.  The third table below ranks the 40 most isolated major summits of Greenland.



Highest major summits

Of the highest major summits of Greenland, four peaks exceed  elevation and 24 peaks equal or exceed  elevation.

Most prominent summits

Of the most prominent summits of Greenland, only Gunnbjørn Fjeld exceeds  of topographic prominence.  Six peaks exceed  and 38 peaks are ultra-prominent summits with at least  of topographic prominence.

Most isolated major summits

Of the most isolated major summits of Greenland, only Gunnbjørn Fjeld exceeds  of topographic isolation.  Four peaks exceed  of topographic isolation, 13 peaks exceed , and 21 peaks exceed  of topographic isolation.

Gallery

See also

List of mountain peaks of North America

List of mountain peaks of Canada
List of mountain peaks of the Rocky Mountains
List of mountain peaks of the United States
List of mountain peaks of México
List of mountain peaks of Central America
List of mountain peaks of the Caribbean
Physical geography
Topography
Topographic elevation
Topographic prominence
Topographic isolation

Notes

References

External links

Kalaallit Nunaat
Bivouac.com
Peakbagger.com
Peaklist.org
Peakware.com
Summitpost.org

 

Geography of Greenland
Peaks
Greenland, List Of Mountain Peaks Of
Greenland, List Of Mountain Peaks Of
Greenland, List Of Mountain Peaks Of

de:Liste der Berge oder Erhebungen in Nordamerika
qu:Lista: Urqu (Chinchay Awya Yala)